Holothyrus is a genus of mites in the order Holothyrida. It includes two species, Holothyrus coccinella  and Holothyrus legendrei.

References

Acari genera
Parasitiformes